Friedrich Keller may refer to:

Friedrich Ludwig Keller (1799–1860), Swiss-German jurist
Friedrich Gottlob Keller (1816–1895), German machinist and inventor of the wood pulping process for papermaking
Fritz Keller (1913–1985), German-born French footballer

See also
Friedrich von Keller (disambiguation)
Fred Keller (disambiguation)